Gorenji Globodol is a settlement in the Municipality of Mirna Peč in southeastern Slovenia. The village preserves its traditional single-storey housing lining the main street with outbuildings and long strips of cultivated land behind each house. The area is part of the historical region of Lower Carniola. The municipality is now included in the Southeast Slovenia Statistical Region.

References

External links
Gorenji Globodol on Geopedia

Populated places in the Municipality of Mirna Peč